Virodhamine (O-arachidonoyl ethanolamine; O-AEA) is an endocannabinoid and a nonclassic eicosanoid, derived from arachidonic acid. O-Arachidonoyl ethanolamine is arachidonic acid and ethanolamine joined by an ester linkage, the opposite of the amide linkage found in anandamide. Based on this opposite orientation, the molecule was named virodhamine from the Sanskrit word virodha, which means opposition. It acts as an antagonist of the CB1 receptor and agonist of the CB2 receptor. Concentrations of virodhamine  in the human hippocampus are similar to those of anandamide, but they are 2- to 9-fold higher in peripheral tissues that express CB2. Virodhamine lowers body temperature in mice, demonstrating cannabinoid activity in vivo.

See also 
 Anandamide
 Oleamide

References

Eicosanoids
Endocannabinoids
Fatty acid esters
CB1 receptor antagonists
CB2 receptor agonists